The Donner Party is a 2009 American period Western drama film written and directed by Terrence Martin (credited as T.J. Martin), and starring Crispin Glover, Clayne Crawford, Michele Santopietro, Mark Boone Junior, and Christian Kane. It is based on the true story of the Donner Party, an 1840s westward traveling group of settlers headed for California. Becoming snowbound in the Sierra Nevada mountains, with food increasingly scarce, a small group calling themselves "The Forlorn Hope" turned to cannibalism. The Forlorn was the working title for the film.

Plot

The film opens with text explaining who the Donner Party was and how they ended up in the terrible situation of passing the cutoff.

Cast
 Crispin Glover as William Foster
 Clayne Crawford as William Eddy
 Michele Santopietro as Amanda McCutchen
 Mark Boone Junior as Franklin Graves
 Christian Kane as Charles Stanton
 Crispian Belfrage as Patrick Dolan
 Catherine Black as Ann Fosdick
 Jamie Anne Allman as Eleanor Eddy 
 Jack Kyle as Milt McCutchen
 Cary Wayne as Jay Fosdick
 Alison Haislip as Mary Graves
 Mara LaFontaine as Sarah Foster
 John A. Lorenz as Luis

Production
As well as being Martin's directorial debut, The Donner Party was production company Anacapa Entertainment's first feature film. It premiered at the Austin Film Festival on October 23, 2009, Its DVD release was three months later on January 26. Shooting was swift, with principal photography at the Donner Pass, California taking only 12 days. Originally, the work had a higher budget, with greater use of child stars and a longer shooting schedule. However, the original production company pulled funding for the project, so several changes were made. The title change was a marketing choice by the distributor.

The soundtrack was done by the Aspiro Choir under Mary Amond O'Brien.

Release

Home media
The film was released on DVD by First Look Pictures on January 26, 2010. It was later re-released by Millennium Entertainment on October 20, 2015 as a part of its 12 Movie Sci-Fi Pack.

Reception

The website Bloody Good Horror gave the film an unfavorable review, describing Crispin Glover's performance as boring and the story dull. "Simply put, 'The Donner Party' is a plodding chore of a movie to watch. It’s a history professor’s voiceover away from being indistinguishable from your average History Channel reenactment."

Dread Central awarded the film a score of three out of five, commending Glover and Boone Junior's performances, writing: "T.J. Martin's cinematic version of this dreadful episode in American history is carried off rather well although, as always seems to be the case with films based on historical events, a lot of what transpires in the film never happened, which IS annoying to history buffs like myself. At least the film was shot during the winter in the Donner Pass near Truckee, California, which helped with the verisimilitude."  
Horror News.Net gave the film a positive review, writing, "Overall "The Donner Party" was a nice change from the hard core horror films that I usually watch. I have a feeling it will be shown in a lot of high school history classes in the future as there is really nothing offensive that would make it inappropriate for younger viewers. If you are in the mood for something a little different I suggest you give it a try. I also recommend that you have something to eat on hand while watching it as I was starving by the time I was done watching it. Then again, maybe I have issues."

See also

 Cannibalism in popular culture
Survival film

References

External links
 
 

2009 independent films
2009 films
2009 drama films
American drama films
Films set in California
Films shot in California
American independent films
Donner Party
Drama films based on actual events
Films about cannibalism
2000s English-language films
2000s American films